In Buddhism, faith refers to a serene commitment to the practice of the Buddha's teaching and trust in enlightened or highly developed beings, such as Buddhas or bodhisattvas (those aiming to become a Buddha). Buddhists usually recognize multiple objects of faith, but many are especially devoted to one in particular, such as one particular Buddha. Faith may not only be devotion to a person, but exists in relation to Buddhist concepts like the efficacy of karma and the possibility of enlightenment.

Faith in early Buddhism focused on the Triple Gem, that is, the Buddha; his teaching (the dharma); and finally, the community of spiritually developed followers or the monastic community seeking enlightenment (the saṅgha). A faithful devotee was called an upāsaka or upāsika, a status for which no formal initiation was required. Early Buddhism valued personal verification of spiritual truth highest in attaining such truth, and considered sacred scriptures, reason or faith in a teacher less valuable sources of authority. As important as faith was, it was merely a first step on the path to wisdom and enlightenment, and was made obsolete or redefined at the final stage of that path. Early Buddhism did not morally condemn peaceful offerings to deities. Throughout the history of Buddhism, the worship of deities, often from pre-Buddhist and animist origins, was appropriated or transformed into Buddhist practices and beliefs. As part of this process, such deities were explained as subordinate to the Triple Gem, which still kept a central role.

In the later stratum of Buddhist history, especially in Mahāyāna Buddhism, faith was given a much more important role. Mahāyāna introduced devotion to Buddhas and bodhisattvas residing in Pure Lands and with the rise of devotion to the Amithaba Buddha in Pure Land Buddhism faith gained a central role in Buddhist practice. The Japanese form of Pure Land Buddhism, under the teachers Hōnen and Shinran, believed that only entrusting faith toward the Amitābha Buddha was a fruitful form of practice, as it dismissed celibacy, meditation and other Buddhist practices as no longer effective, or as contradicting the virtue of faith. Pure Land Buddhists defined faith as a state similar to enlightenment, with a sense of self-negation and humility. Mahayana sutras, such as the Lotus Sutra, became objects of worship, and the recitation and copying of these sutras were believed to create great merit. The impact of faith in Buddhist religiosity became pivotal in millenarian movements in several Buddhist countries, which sometimes resulted in the destruction of royal dynasties and other important political changes.

Thus, the role of faith increased throughout Buddhist history. However, from the nineteenth century onward, in countries like Sri Lanka and Japan, and also in the West, Buddhist modernism has downplayed and criticized the role of faith in Buddhism. Faith in Buddhism still has a role in modern Asia and the West, but is understood and defined differently from traditional interpretations, with modern values and eclecticism becoming more important.  The Dalit Buddhist community, specifically the Navayāna movement, has interpreted Buddhist concepts in the light of the political situation of the Dalits, in which there is tension between modernist rationalism and local devotion.

Role in Buddhist teaching 

Faith is defined as serene trust that the practice of the Buddha's teaching will bring fruit. It is trust and surrender to enlightened or highly developed beings, such as Buddhas or bodhisattvas, or even certain highly respected monks or lamas sometimes seen as living Buddhas. Buddhists usually recognize multiple objects of faith, but many are especially devoted to one particular object of faith, such as one particular Buddha. Buddhism has, however, never been organized around one central authority, neither as a person or a scripture. Scriptures have usually acted as guidance, and consensus about practices has come about through debate and discussion.

Several terms are used in Buddhism for faith, which have both cognitive and affective aspects:
 Śraddhā (Sanskrit; ; classical Chinese: wen-hsin) refers to a sense of commitment to or trust in someone else, or a sense of engagement and commitment to practise. Traditional examples of this are the monks Ānanda, the attendant of Gautama Buddha, and Vakkali, another disciple. Śraddhā is often seen as the counteragent of ill-will in the mind. The opposite of śraddhā is āśraddhya, which refers to the lack of capacity to develop faith in a teacher and the teachings, and therefore being unable to develop energy on the spiritual path. The word śraddhā originates from the roots śrat, "to have conviction", and dhā, "to uphold", and thus, according to religious studies scholar Sung-bae Park, indicates "sustaining confidence, remaining steadfast, or supporting trust, in the sense of abiding firmly".
 Prasāda (Sanskrit; ; classical Chinese: ching-hsin) is more affective than śraddhā. Being used with regard to rituals and ceremonies, it refers to a sense of serene acceptance of the blessings and greatness of the object of one's devotion. The word prasāda derives from the prefix pra and the root sād, which mean "to sink down, to sit", and is defined by Park as "being firmly seated in a state of clearness and tranquility". Thus, prasāda refers to the focus of the devotee's mind, its commitment and its heightened quality. It is described in more spontaneous terms than śraddhā.

Faith is usually related to the Triple Gem, that is the Buddha, the dharma (his teaching) and the saṅgha (the community). Thus, faith may often have certain individuals as its object, but is different from devotion in other Indian religions (bhakti) in that it is connected with impersonal objects such as the working of karma and the efficacy of merit transfer. It is seen to focus on or lead to a right view or understanding of the main aspects of the Buddha's teaching, such as the working of karma, merit and rebirth. Regarding the Triple Gem, faith focuses on and rejoices in the characteristics of the Buddha, the dharma and the saṅgha. With regard to the working of karma, faith refers to a conviction that deeds have effects, good deeds having positive effects, and wrong deeds negative. Thus, faith gives guidance in leading a life of charity, morality and religious qualities. Faith also covers ideas such as the nature of existence, its impermanence and conditioned nature, and finally, the Buddha's enlightenment or Nirvana and the path of practice leading up to Nirvana. Faith entails a belief that there are people who have attained Nirvana and are able to teach it.

History 
Hajime Nakamura distinguishes two currents in Buddhism, which he describes as the devotional approach and the approach of "inner knowledge". Anthropologist Melford Spiro discusses bhakti (devotion) on the one hand and magga (the path to deliverance) on the other hand. In Buddhism, in the development of the understanding of faith, two historical layers can be distinguished: early Buddhism and the later Mahāyāna Buddhism. Some early twentieth-century scholars, such as Louis de La Vallée-Poussin, Arthur Berriedale Keith and Caroline Rhys Davids, have been criticized by Sri Lankan scholars for not distinguishing the two sufficiently.

Early Buddhism 

In early Buddhist texts, such as Pāli texts, saddhā is usually translated as "faith", but with a different connotation than the English word. It is sometimes also translated as "confidence", as in  confidence in doctrine. Faith in early Buddhism, in the words of scholar John Bishop, is essentially "religious without being theistic". It does not focus on a God as the centre of the religion. As opposed to Vedic Brahmanism, which preceded Buddhism, early Buddhist ideas of faith are more connected with the teachings that are learnt and practised, rather than focused on an outward deity. This does not mean that Buddhism's approach of reality had not been influenced by other traditions: at the time when Buddhism arose, several Indian religious communities taught a critical approach in understanding the truth.

Faith is not just a mental commitment to a set of principles, but also has an affective quality. Scholars in early Buddhism distinguish between faith as joy and serenity, raising the mind to a higher level; and
faith as an energy producing self-confidence, required for dealing with temptations and for self-mastery. Because faith helps remove perplexity, it inspires and gives energy to the devotee.

A Buddhist thus aspires to faith in the Triple Gem, that is, the Buddha, the dharma and the saṅgha, as well as the value of discipline. In early Buddhist texts, however, faith does not mean a hostile response or lack of recognition of other deities. Although the Buddha refutes the bloody sacrifice of animals, he does not in itself condemn peaceful offerings to deities, but considers those far less useful than alms offerings to the monastic saṅgha. Thus, everything is given its place in a hierarchy of usefulness, in which moral behavior is much more highly regarded than rites and rituals.

Faith is the consequence of impermanence and a wise perception of suffering (dukkha). Reflection on suffering and impermanence leads the devotees to a sense of fear and agitation, which motivates them to take refugee in the Triple Gem and cultivate faith as a result. Faith then leads to many other important mental qualities on the path to Nirvana, such as joy, concentration and insight. Faith in itself, however, is never regarded as sufficient for the attainment of Nirvana.

A faithful Buddhist layman or laywoman is called an upāsaka or upāsika, respectively. To become a layperson, no formal ritual is required. Some Pāli Canon passages, as well as later commentators such as Buddhaghosa, state that a Buddhist layman can go to heaven only by the strength of his faith in and love for the Buddha, yet in other passages faith is listed together with other virtues, such as morality, as qualities that lead the devotee to heaven. Regardless, faith is an important part of the ideal of Buddhist laypeople, as they are described to be in the habit of seeing the saṅgha, listening to their teachings, and most importantly, providing charity for the saṅgha. Saddhā in the lay life is strongly connected with dāna (generosity): the faithful gift is the most spiritually important gift.

Faith is included in lists of virtues for laypeople, and is therefore described as a progressive quality for devotees, as a devotee who is new to the Buddhist religion is characterized as "young in devotion". Thus, there are various lists of virtues in which faith is included, and other early traditions have also given faith a prominent role, such as the Sarvāstivāda tradition. Moreover, early Buddhism describes faith as an important quality in stream-enterers, a state preceding enlightenment. In standard descriptions of people going forth (taking ordination as a monk), faith is mentioned as an important motivation. Despite this role, some Indologists such as André Bareau and Lily De Silva believed early Buddhism did not assign the same value to faith as in some other religions, such as Christianity. Bareau argued that "Buddhism has no comparable [idea of] pure faith as in Christianity, ... The idea of blind faith, an absolute faith in a master's word, goes completely against the spirit of early Buddhism." Translator Caroline Rhys Davids disagreed with such statements, however, stating that "faith is no less important than it is for all religions worthy of the name". Indologist Richard Gombrich argues that Buddhism does not prescribe believing in someone or something to the extent of going against reason. Also, Gombrich believes the Buddha did not aim to create a religion that focuses on devotion to his person, though he recognizes that such devotion already started when the Buddha was still alive. Gombrich notes that there is a lot of material in the early scriptures emphasizing how important faith is, but argues that "the growth of Buddhist rites and liturgies was surely a wholly unintended consequence of the Buddha's preaching".

Taking refuge 

Since early Buddhism, devotees expressed their faith through the act of taking refuge, which is threefold. In this, it centres on the authority of a Buddha as a supremely awakened being, by assenting to a role for a Buddha as a teacher of both humans and devās (heavenly beings). This often includes other Buddhas from the past, and Buddhas who have not yet arisen. Secondly, the taking of refuge honours the truth and efficacy of the Buddha's spiritual doctrine, which includes the characteristics of phenomenon such as their impermanence, and the path to liberation. The taking of refuge ends with the acceptance of worthiness of the community of spiritually developed followers (the saṅgha), which is mostly defined as the monastic community, but may also include lay people and even devās provided they are nearly or completely enlightened. Early Buddhism did not include bodhisattvas in the Three Refuges, because they were considered to still be on the path to enlightenment.

Early texts describe the saṅgha as a "field of merit", because early Buddhists regard offerings to them as particularly karmically fruitful. Lay devotees support and revere the saṅgha, of which they believe it will render them merit and bring them closer to enlightenment. At the same time, the Buddhist monk is given a significant role in promoting and upholding faith among laypeople. Although many examples in the canon are mentioned of well-behaved monks, there are also cases of monks misbehaving. In such cases, the texts describe that the Buddha responds with great sensitivity to the perceptions of the lay community. When the Buddha sets out new rules in the monastic code to deal with the wrongdoings of his monastics, he usually states that such behavior should be curbed, because it would not "persuade non-believers" and "believers will turn away". He expects monks, nuns and novices to not only to lead the spiritual life for their own benefit, but also to uphold the faith of the people. On the other hand, they are not to take the task of inspiring faith to the extent of hypocrisy or inappropriateness, for example, by taking on other professions apart from being a monastic, or by courting favours by giving items to the laypeople.

Thus, taking refuge is a form of aspiration to lead a life with the Triple Gem at its core. Taking refuge is done by a short formula in which one names the Buddha, the dharma and the saṅgha as refuges. In early Buddhist scriptures, taking refuge is an expression of determination to follow the Buddha's path, but not a relinquishing of responsibility.

Through verification 

Faith can lead practitioners to take refuge in the Triple Gem, which opens them up to new spiritual experiences previously unknown to them. This is the devotional or mystical aspect of faith. But there is also a rational aspect, in that the value of taking refuge is rooted in personal verification. In the discourse (sutta) called the Kalāma Sutta, the Buddha argues against following sacred authority, tradition, a doctrine of logic, or respecting teachers for the mere fact that they are one's teachers. Knowledge coming from such sources is based on greed, hatred and delusion and Buddhist devotees should consider such knowledge impartially and not blindly. However, it should not all be refuted either. They should find out whether a teaching is true by personal verification of spiritual truth instead, distinguishing what leads to happiness and benefit, and what does not. Giving an example of such an approach, the Buddha states that the practice of abandoning greed, hatred and delusion will benefit the practitioner, regardless of whether there is such a thing as karmic retribution and rebirth. Thus, personal experience and judgement are emphasized in accepting the Buddha and Buddhism. A person should, however, also heed the counsel of the wise.

In the discourse called the Canki Sutta, the Buddha points out that people's beliefs may turn out in two different ways: they might either be genuine, factual and not mistaken; or vain, empty and false. Thus, when a person holds a certain belief, they should not derive the conclusion "Only this is true, anything else is false," but instead "preserve the truth" with the awareness "This is my belief". Thus, the discourse criticizes, among others, divine revelation, tradition and report, as leading to "groundless faith" and as an incomplete means of acquiring spiritual knowledge or truth. But in the Sandaka Sutta, the Buddha also criticizes mere reasoning or logic as a means of attaining to truth. Instead, personal and direct intuitive knowledge are required to attain the truth, when such knowledge is not affected by bias. Thus, belief and faith are not considered sufficient for arriving at truth, even in spiritual matters where other religious traditions would refer to faith. The Buddha does not agree with traditions that demand blind faith in scriptures or teachers. In one discourse, when asked on which authority the Buddha bases his teachings on, he answers that he does not base them on tradition, faith, or reason, bur rather on personal experience as a source of authority.

In conclusion, the Buddhist devotee should verify moral judgment and truth by personal experience. This then leads to a provisional acceptance, called "preserving the truth". Faith goes hand-in-hand with an open attitude of willing to learn and try out, familiarizing oneself with the teaching. Through personal verification a person's faith deepens, ultimately changing from "preserving" to "discovering" the truth. This verification process involves ordinary experience, but also the yogic experience of cultivation of the mind. Furthermore, the Buddha applies these criteria to his own teaching: he is qualified to teach his dharma because he has verified it for himself, not learnt it from someone else or reasoned it out. The Buddha states in several discourses, including the Vimaṁsaka Sutta, that his disciples should investigate even him as to whether he really is enlightened and pure in conduct, by observing him for a long time. Several people are described in the Pāli Canon observing the Buddha in such way, and arriving at grounded faith. This does not mean, however, that the Buddha does not accept any acts of reverence to his person: he teaches that devotional acts can help to uplift the lay practitioners' minds, and help them on the path to a better rebirth and enlightenment. Devotion is therefore a subject that requires the serious practitioner's interest.

As initial step 

Faith is an initial trust in the Buddha as a spiritual teacher and an initial acceptance of the Buddha's teachings. Faith is considered of great benefit to a beginning practitioner of the Buddhist teaching. In the Cula-hatthipadopama Sutta, the Buddha describes the path of enlightenment as starting with faith in him, but continuing with the practise of virtue, meditation and wisdom, culminating in the achievement of enlightenment. Thus, the initial faith provides the confidence to continue the path up unto the final aim, and for this reason, in early Buddhist teachings faith is usually listed as the first quality in progressive lists of virtues.

Besides saddhā, another word, pasāda, and its related synonyms pasanna and pasidati, are sometimes also translated as 'faith', but are given a higher value than saddhā. Saddhā deepens when someone progresses along the spiritual path, and early texts sometimes describe this as pasāda, and sometimes as bhakti. Pasāda is faith and attraction towards a teacher, but is accompanied by clarity of mind, placidity and understanding. The practicing disciple develops and stabilizes his faith, basing it on spiritual insight. This leads his faith to become "unshakeable".

Thus, faith is by itself not enough to attain deliverance, but is a first step on the path leading to wisdom and enlightenment. Many teachings in early Buddhism mention faith as the first step, whereas wisdom is mentioned as the last. On the last stage of the Buddhist path, the attainment of arahant, the practitioner has completely replaced faith by wisdom. At that point, the arahant no longer relies on faith at all, although at this stage sometimes a form of realized faith is described. Therefore, the Buddha praises most of his disciples for their wisdom, rather than their faith. The exception to that, the monk Vakkali, praised by the Buddha as "the highest of those who had faith", is also taught by the Buddha to concentrate on the teaching, rather than the Buddha's person. The Buddha is seen admonishing his disciple Ānanda in a similar way.

In the Pāli Canon, different approaches of faith are described. Developing faith in someone's person, even the Buddha himself, is of little use when it is too much connected with superficial features—such as physical appearance—and too little with the Buddha's teaching. Such an approach to faith is said to lead to affection and anger and has other disadvantages. It is an impediment to walking in the steps of the Buddha and attaining enlightenment, such as in the case of Vakkali. Faith and devotion must always go hand-in-hand with a sense of equanimity.

Mahāyāna Buddhism 

During the period of emperor Ashoka (third to second century BCE), Buddhists placed more emphasis on faith, as Ashoka helped develop Buddhism as a popular religion to unify his empire. This new trend led to an increased worship of stūpas and an increase of Avadāna faith-based literature. In the second century CE, it became more common to depict the Buddha through images, and there was a shift in emphasis in Indian religion towards emotional devotionalism. This led to new perspectives in Buddhism, summarized by Buddhist studies scholar Peter Harvey as "compassion, faith and wisdom". These perspectives paved the way to the arising of Mahāyāna Buddhism.

In general, the role of faith in Mahāyāna Buddhism is similar to that of Theravāda—in both, faith is an unavoidable part of practice. Even in present-day Theravāda Buddhism, originating from Pāli Buddhism, faith is still important in traditional Buddhist societies. Theravādins see faith in the Triple Gem as a protective force in daily life, especially when combined with a moral life. However, with the rising of Mahāyāna Buddhism, the depth and range of teachings on faith intensified. A great number of bodhisattvas became focus of devotion and faith, giving Mahāyāna Buddhism a "theistic" side. In early Buddhism, there were already some passages that suggested the Buddha and other enlightened beings had a world-transcending nature. Later Theravādins believed that Maitreya, the future Buddha, was waiting for them in heaven and they honoured him gradually more. Nevertheless, Mahāyānists took this idea much further. After the Buddha's death, there was a sense of regret among Buddhist communities about the absence of the Buddha in the world, and a desire to "see" the Buddha and receive his power. Mahāyānists extended the meaning of the Triple Gem to include Buddhas that reside in heavens, and later called these sambhogakāya Buddhas ('embodiment of the enjoyment of the Dharma'). The increased emphasis on these celestial Buddhas, manifest all the time and everywhere, started to overshadow the role of Gautama Buddha in the Buddhist faith. Pure Land Buddhism mostly focused its faith to these celestial Buddhas, especially the Buddha Amitābha.

Starting from this devotion to celestial Buddhas, advanced bodhisattva beings, representing Mahāyāna ideals, gradually became focus of an extensive worship and cult. By the sixth century, depiction of bodhisattvas in Buddhist iconography had become common, such as the bodhisattva Avalokiteśvara representing compassion, and Manjusri wisdom. Accounts about the bodhisattvas and their good deeds often included actions with great stakes, and it is likely that writers meant these accounts as devotional more than exemplary.

Thus, in the twelfth and thirteenth centuries the emphasis in Japanese Buddhism shifted from personal enlightenment to connecting with the universal Buddha nature and the realms in which the Buddhas live. With the development of the Mādhyamaka system of thought, the Buddha was no longer regarded as only a historical person, and the idea of essential unity in all living beings became an intrinsic part of Buddhist theory and practice. According to Buddhist scholar Minoru Kiyota, this development led to the devotion movement of Pure Land Buddhism, whereas in Zen Buddhism it led to the emphasis of seeking the Buddha Nature within oneself.

Terms for faith that are primarily used in Mahāyāna Buddhism are Xin (Chinese) and shin (Japanese): these terms can refer to trust, but also an unquestioned acceptance of the object of one's devotion. They are also used, as it is in Chan and Zen Buddhism, with regard to a confidence that the Buddha nature (tathāgatagarbha) is hidden within one's mind, and can be found as one suspends the habits of the mind. As such, Chan and Zen Buddhists consider faith as one of the Three Essentials in meditation practice, together with resolve and doubt. Pure Land Buddhists, on the other hand, make a distinction between the aspect of the mind which is faithful, and which is awakened by practising devotion and humility to the Buddha Amitābha, known as xinji (Chinese) or shinjin (Japanese); and the joy and confidence of being able to meet the Buddha  Amitābha, known as xinfa (Chinese) or shingyō (Japanese). Pure Land traditions describe the awakening of faith as a transcendental experience beyond time, similar to a state preceding enlightenment. In the teachings of the Japanese Pure Land teacher Shinran, such experience of faith, which he called "the Light" (Japanese: kōmyō) involved devotees not only feeling completely assured about the Buddha Amitābha as to his determination and wisdom to save them, but also feeling fully reliant on Amitābha because of their personal incapacity.

Despite the important developments that took place in the arising of Mahāyāna Buddhism, it would be simplistic to state that no devotional movement existed before Mahāyāna. Devotionalism had become common in texts and practices in the same period that the Abhidhamma texts were compiled, even before Mahāyāna developed. Furthermore, later Theravāda Buddhism started emphasizing hagiographical accounts of the Buddha and bodhisattva more, and in many accounts the Buddha played a major role in other people's enlightenment.

Tiantai, Tendai and Nichiren Buddhism 

The Lotus Sūtra, one of the most worshiped texts in Southeast Asia , embraces the ideal of faith.
In medieval China and Japan, many miraculous legends were related to the Lotus Sūtra, contributing to its popularity. Scholars have suggested that the sūtra's emphasis on the Buddha as a father has helped make the sūtra popular.

The Lotus Sūtra was composed in the first two centuries of the Common Era. Part of the "Cult of the Book", Mahāyānists substituted the worship of relic stupas with the worship of the Dharma represented in the sutra.  They honoured and worshiped the Lotus Sūtra just like many other Mahāyāna sutras, similar to the worship of stūpas before the arising of Mahāyāna Buddhism. They worshiped the Lotus Sūtra more than most sūtras. The sūtra itself describes different types of devotion to it—receiving and keeping, reading, reciting, teaching and transcribing it—and was actually worshiped in a large variety of ways. In some copies, scribes depicted every letter similar to a Buddha, enshrined in a stūpa.

Although the theoretical implications of the Lotus Sūtra influenced traditional scholars, the devotional practices surrounding the sūtra affected Buddhism even more. The Chinese Tiantai school (6th century) and its later Japanese form, Tendai, further promoted worship of the Lotus Sūtra, combined with devotion toward Amitābha Buddha. These schools believe the sūtra to be supreme among all of the Buddha's teachings, and leading to enlightenment in the present lifetime. Some schools of the Kamakura period (twelfth–fourteenth century), took reverence towards the Lotus Sūtra to the extent that they saw it as the single one vehicle or path of the dharma, and the Japanese teacher Nichiren (1222–82) believed only this practice led society to an ideal Buddha land.

Nichiren promoted faith in and worship of the sūtra for this reason, criticizing other schools and types of worship sharply. Seeing the sutra as a prophecy of the mission of his own movement, Nichiren believed that through devotion to the sutra a Pure Land on earth could be realized, a land which is a depiction of the ideal of enlightenment in Māhayāna Buddhism. He taught that worship of the sūtra led the practitioner to unite with the primordial Buddha, of whom he believed all Buddhas are manifestations. Nichiren promoted the invocation of the sutra title based "on faith alone". Despite this great devotion to the Lotus Sūtra, Nichiren de-emphasized the study of the sutra, believing that chanting the title of the sutra, was the most effective practice for people living in the "Age of Dharma Decline". 

In the present day, more than forty organizations continue upon the Nichiren tradition, some of which are lay organizations.

Pure Land Buddhism 

It is perhaps in the "Pure Land" sūtras that faith and devotion reach a pinnacle of soteriological importance. When devotion to celestial Buddhas developed in Mahāyāna Buddhism, the idea arose that these Buddhas were able to create 'Buddha-fields' ), or Pure Lands. In Pure Land Buddhism, it is one's faith in the salvific compassion of the Buddha Amitābha, coupled with the earnest wish to enter his Pure Land that is said to bring deliverance there. This Pure Land  prepares the devotee for entry into awakening and Nirvana. Pure Land Buddhism differed in many ways from most forms of Buddhism at the time, which were based on personal effort and techniques of self-mastery.

Mahāyānist Buddhists considered Amitābha (Sanskrit, 'limitless light') as one of the celestial Buddhas. The Longer Sukhāvatīvyūha Sūtra describes the Buddha Amitābha as a monk who, practicing under a Buddha in a previous age, vowed to create a land through his spiritual powers. Through this ideal land he would easily be able to guide many living beings to final enlightenment. He therefore vowed that once he had attained Buddhahood, just calling his name would be enough for living beings to be born in this Pure Land. Widespread in Japan, Korea, China and Tibet, devotion to the Buddha Amitābha arose in India around the beginning of the Common Era. Central to Pure Land Buddhism is the idea that the current age humans live in is the Age of Dharma Decline (Chinese: mofa, Japanese: mappō), the final stage of the current Buddha's dispensation. Pure Land Buddhists believe that in this period people are severely limited in their own capability for attaining salvation. They must therefore rely on external power (the Buddha Amitābha) to find salvation, and delay their attainment of Nirvana to another life (during their rebirth in the Pure Land). This shared sentiment may have been due to the violent civil conflicts, famines, fires and decay of monastic institutions. But the idea of reliance on an external power might also have been a consequence of the Mahāyāna teachings on the nature of the Buddha, which made the distance between the unenlightened and Buddhahood much greater.

Pure Land Buddhism was established as an institution by the teacher Huiyuan (334–416 CE) on Mount Lu with the founding of the White Lotus Society. Shandao (613–681) started emphasizing reciting mantras in honour of Amitābha Buddha (Chinese: nianfo; Japanese: nembutsu), combined with several other practices. There seems to have been a paradox in Pure Land faith from the start, in that two ideals were advocated simultaneously: on the one hand, Pure Land teachers taught that the bodhisattvas who created their Pure Lands were exemplary in their own efforts to make merits as an energy to create the Pure Land from, inspiring the devotee to follow this example. On the other hand, it was taught that practitioners should solely rely on their devotion to the Buddhas in the Pure Land, in particular Amitābha, who would come to their rescue. In Japanese Pure Land Buddhism, the latter ideal became prevalent. But even in Japan, there was much debate as to what emphasis to give to the  efforts of the devotee on the one hand, and the  reliance on Amitābha Buddha and his vow on the other hand.

Pure Land Buddhism is currently still one of the most popular forms of religion in East Asia, and is practised by most East Asian monks. As of the 1990s, the older generation of Chinese people still used the Amitābha mantra in common everyday greetings.

Japan 
The Tendai scholar Genshin (942–1017), Tendai priest Hōnen (1133–1212) and his student Shinran (1173–1262) applied Shandao's teachings in Japan, creating Pure Land Buddhism there as a separate school for the first time. They believed and taught that mindfully reciting the nembutsu would be enough to secure the faithful person's entrance into the Western Paradise. Although Hōnen had initially stated that  repeating the mantra would make salvation more certain, Shinran later said that  utterance would be enough for salvation (Japanese: ichinengi). Subsequent repetitions would be mere expressions of gratitude to the Buddha Amitābha, which also held for other religious routines and practices. Deep understanding of the Buddha's teachings, moral practice and meditation were not necessary, Shinran concluded, even considering some practices such as meditation as detrimental to reliance on Amitābha Buddha.

The concept of faith that Shinran adopted originated with Shandao: firstly, a sincere belief in the person of Amitābha Buddha; secondly, a deep trust in the vow that Amitābha Buddha had taken, and a conviction one's own low nature, and finally, a desire to dedicate the merits accrued from doing good deeds to be born in the Pure Land where Amitābha Buddha was believed to live. These three were together known as 'singleness of heart' (Japanese: isshin). Shinran further taught that such full faith would make people equal to Maitreya, the coming Buddha, because their full enlightenment would be irreversibly assured.

Shinran took Hōnen's teaching to the extreme: since he was convinced that he was destined to fall in hell without the help of the Buddha Amitābha, devotion to the Buddha Amitābha and trust in his vow was the single way to salvation. Whereas Hōnen had emphasized mostly devotion to the Buddha Amitābha, he did not do so exclusively: Shinran, on the other hand, taught a path of devotion to only the Buddha Amitābha. Thus, Shinran's Pure Land Buddhism focused on a limited set of practices, in contrast to the many practices of Tendai Buddhism. Characteristic of this period in Japanese Buddhism was the selective nature of faith: Japanese Pure Land teachers such as Shinran taught that Pure Land was the  form of Buddhism that was the right path; other forms of Buddhism were criticized as ineffective for the Age of Dharma Decline. (This development of 'selective Buddhism', Japanese:senchaku bukkyō, would also affect Nichiren Buddhism.) Thirdly, although early Buddhism already emphasized letting-go of self-conceit by practicing the dharma, in the later Pure Land tradition this was drawn further by stating that people should give up all "self-power" and let the healing power of Amitābha do the work of attaining salvation for them. This power was even believed to transcend the law of karma. Moreover, whereas Honen had taught faith could be built up by the nembutsu practice, Shinran stated that faith needed to  practice, and could not be built up through it. A fourth characteristic of the movement was its democratic nature: in some passages Shinran stated that "wicked" people have just as much chance of attaining to the Pure Land as "good" people, an idea similar to the Christian concept of "salvation of sinners".

The old Buddhist orders highly condemned the movement, for starting a new school, distorting Buddhist teachings, and reviling Gautama Buddha. When the emperor felt that some of Honen's monastics acted inappropriately, Hōnen was banished to a remote province for four years. When Shinran started to teach against the custom of celibacy, stating it indicated a lack of trust in Amitābha Buddha, he was banished as well. Apart from Shinran, other priests that emphasized faith in their interpretations were also banished, as their teachings were often embraced by a following which did not accept the authority of the aristocrats in power.

In the fifteenth century, Rennyo (1415–99), a disciple of Shinran considered the second founder of Shinran's Jōdo Shinshu school, tried to reform the school. He opposed Shinran's idea that morality was not required to enter the Pure Land and meet Amitābha Buddha. He believed that morality should go hand-in-hand with faith, and was a way to express gratitude to Amitābha. Jōdo Shinshu is still the most popular and largest Buddhist sect in Japan today, surviving as the Nishi Hongwanji and the Higashi Hongwanji traditions.

Zen Buddhism 

Just like in Jōdo Shinshu, some forms of Zen Buddhism arose as a reaction to Tendai Buddhism. Just like Pure Land Buddhism, faith also played a role here, that is, in Sōtō Zen. This form of Zen, also known as "farmer's Zen" because of its popularity in agrarian society, was developed by Dōgen (1200–53). Apart from the focus on meditation practice which was common in Zen Buddhism, Dōgen led a revival of interest in the study of the sūtras, which he taught would inspire to a faith based on understanding. Inspired by Chinese Chan Buddhism, Dōgen was attracted to a return of the simple life as exemplified by the Buddha in the sūtras. He further believed that sitting meditation was not only the path to enlightenment, but also a way to  the Buddha nature within. The practitioner should have the faith that the Buddha nature is already within, Dōgen taught, although Dōgen did not believe this was in the form of a permanent self. Dōgen believed enlightenment was possible in this life—even the secular life—and he did not believe in the idea of the Age of Dharma Decline.

Avalokiteśvara 

In East Asian Buddhism, there has been a strong focus on worship of the bodhisattva Avalokiteśvara. His cult originated in the northern borders of India, but he has been honoured for his compassion in many countries, such as China, Tibet, Japan, Sri Lanka and other parts of Southeast Asia, and among diverse levels of society.

The text called the Avalokiteśvara Sūtra states that Avalokiteśvara will help anyone who speaks his name with faith, fulfilling many kinds of wishes, and awakening people to their compassionate Buddha nature. Avalokiteśvara is strongly connected to the Buddha Amitābha, as it is believed that he lives in the same Pure Land, and will come to the rescue of those who invoke the name of the Buddha Amitābha. Focusing on both mundane benefits and salvation, devotion to Avalokiteśvara was promoted through the spread of the Lotus Sūtra, which includes a chapter about him, as well as through the Perfection of Wisdom sūtras. Avalokiteśvara's devotees often depict him as a female, and in this female form she is known as Guanyin in China, originating from an association with the female Buddhist deity Tārā. Presently, Avalokiteśvara and his female form Guanyin are among the most depicted figures in Buddhism, and Guanyin is also worshiped by Daoists.

Other historical developments

Deities 

In Buddhism, Buddhas and other enlightened beings are the main focus of honour, comparable to that of gods in other religions. Although Buddhism does recognize the existence of deities, Buddhas and other enlightened beings are considered to be different, in that they are seen as outside of the cycle of existence. This does not mean that worship of deities did not exist in Buddhism. However, worship of deities has often been considered a form of superstition or a form of skillful means to guide the unenlightened to a better life, and not much more than that.

In the history of the diffusion of Buddhism, the relation between Buddhism and local deities was an important aspect of success, but Buddhists have often denied this because of local movements for orthodoxy. Furthermore, scholars have paid little interest to the role of local deities, since it is not covered by any of the standard academic disciplines studying Buddhism, such as Buddhist studies or anthropology. Nevertheless, deities had a role in Buddhist cosmology from early onward. Buddhist traditions saw them, however, as subordinate to the Buddha, and related many stories of them embracing the Buddhist teaching and even becoming protectors of it. When Buddhist teachers adopted existing cosmologies, but placed the Buddha on top of these systems, a Buddhist cosmology arose. Part of this process was depicting these deities as violent and disorganized, as opposed to Buddhism and its practitioners—this was not far from the truth, as Buddhist missionaries often came from more ordered and less violent cultures. In this way snake-like deities (nāga), bird-like deities and violent spirits which previously were the focus of pre-Buddhist cults became guardians of the Buddhist teaching. This process of adopting deities as part of Buddhism often occurred when Buddhist devotees or monks did not fully renounce their former devotions when embracing Buddhism. In the early Pāli scriptures, as well as in some customs in traditional Buddhist societies, traces can still be found of the period that Buddhism competed with nāga worship and assimilated some of its features.

In some Buddhist countries like Japan, a perspective arose of the human world as a microcosm of the macrocosmic realms of the Buddhas. This allowed for an increased tolerance of local traditions and folk religion, which were seen as connected with this macrocosmos, and thus part of Buddhism. All of these developments led Buddhism to include many deities into its system of faith, but each deity was given his place and role, subordinate to the Buddha. Even the exclusive Jōdo Shinshu taught not to denigrate the worship of Shinto deities called kami, though the school did not allow the worship either. Furthermore, in many Buddhist countries ritual specialists of pre-Buddhist traditions were given a duty besides Buddhist monks. These specialists were usually laypeople, who performed these functions besides their normal lay life.

Buddhism did not only appropriate deities into the religion, but also adapted its own teachings. According to religious studies scholar Donald Swearer, bodhisattvas, relic worship and hagiographies of Buddhist masters were ways for Buddhism to adapt to pre-Buddhist deities and animistic beliefs, by fitting these into the Buddhist thought system. East Asian Buddhist movements like the Chinese White Lotus were transformations of such animistic beliefs. Such transformation of pre-Buddhist beliefs also explains the popularity of movements like Japanese Pure Land Buddhism under Hōnen and Shinran, even though in their teachings they opposed animism.

Millenarianism 

Buddhism is the strongest form of non-western millenarianism. In many Buddhist traditions, there is a concept of a time when the world will end. The concept of a millenarian figure arising in the world at an apocalyptic age exists in many Buddhist traditions. In Buddhism, the growth and decline of the world is believed to come in cycles, and the declining period is believed to end with the arising of the cakravartin and finally, the coming of the future Buddha who will start a new prosperous period. Devotion to such a messianic Buddha figure has been part of almost every Buddhist tradition. Millenarian movements are typically a form of cultural defiance of the dominant culture, resisting "the attempt to put reason and logic over faith", according to political scientist William Miles.

East Asian traditions especially associated the end of the world with the coming of the future Buddha, that is Maitreya. The early Pāli texts only briefly mention him, but he features prominently in later Sanskrit traditions such as the Mahāsāṃghika. China, Burma and Thailand, came to honour him as part of millenarian movements, and they believed that Maitreya Buddha would arise during times of suffering and crisis, to usher in a new era of happiness. From the fourteenth century onward, White Lotus sectarianism arose in China, which encompassed beliefs in the coming of Maitreya during an apocalyptic age. Devotees of White Lotus societies believed that their faith in the correct teachings would save them when the new world era would come. White Lotus millenarianist beliefs would prove persistent, and survived all the way into the nineteenth century, when the Chinese associated the coming of Maitreya's age with political revolution. But the nineteenth century had not been the first century in which millenarian beliefs sparked political changes: during most of China's history, faith in and worship of Maitreya Buddha often inspired rebellions to change society for the better, to await Maitreya. Some of these rebellions led to powerful revolutions and the destruction of royal dynasties. Nevertheless, faith in the coming of a new era of Maitreya was not just political propaganda to incite rebellion, but was, in the words of Chinese Studies scholar Daniel Overmyer, "rooted in continuously existing cultic life."

In Japan, millenarian trends can be observed in the idea of the Age of Dharma Decline, which was most prominent in Nichiren Buddhism. However, more full-fledged forms of millenarianism developed from the nineteenth century onward, with the arising of new religions.

Modern developments

Buddhist modernism 

Although in pre-modern times some schools of Buddhism de-emphasized faith in Buddhist practice, the role of faith really was only criticized widely in modern times. During the eighteenth century Enlightenment, western intellectuals came to see religion as culturally relative, as opposed to the single truth of reason. By the end of the nineteenth century, this view on religion had informed how the West responded to Buddhism. Western writers such as Edwin Arnold began to present Buddhism as the answer to the contradiction between science and religion, as a rational religion devoid of culture. As western science and rationalism spread to Asia, intellectuals in Asian countries such as in Sri Lanka developed similar ideas. Because of the threat of colonial powers and Christianity, and the rise of an urban middle class, at the end of the nineteenth century Sri Lankan Buddhism started to change. Described by present-day scholars as "Buddhist modernism" or "protestant Buddhism", westerners and British-educated Sri Lankans advocated Buddhism as a rational philosophy, free from blind faith and idolatry, congruent with science and modern ideas. They saw traditional practices such as relic worship and other devotional routines as corruptions of an ideal, rational form of Buddhism, while assimilating Victorian and other modern values and designating them as traditional Buddhist, often without awareness of their roots.

In Japan, from the Meiji period onward, the Japanese heavily attacked Buddhism as a foreign and superstitious belief system. In response to this, Buddhist schools such as Zen developed a movement called "New Buddhism" (Japanese: shin bukkyo), emphasizing rationalism, modernism and warrior ideals. Still in Japanese Buddhism, in the twentieth century, a critical response to traditional Buddhism arose, led by the two academics Hakamaya Noriaki and Matsumoto Shirō, called Critical Buddhism. Noriaki and Shirō's school of thought has criticized Chinese and Japanese Buddhist ideas for undermining critical thinking, promoting blind faith and laxity to improve society. East Asian Studies scholar Peter Gregory comments, however, that the attempt of Critical Buddhists at finding a pure, unadulterated Buddhism, ironically, reeks with the very same essentialism it criticizes. Other scholars have made similar arguments. Critical Buddhism criticizes blind faith and a belief in the Buddha Nature, but it does reserve a place for faith: Buddhist faith, states Noriaki, is the uncompromising critical capacity to distinguish between true and false Buddhism, and to commit to what is true Buddhism. Noriaki contrasts such true faith with the Japanese ideal of harmony (wa), which he believes goes hand-in-hand with uncritical acceptance of non-Buddhist ideals, including violence.

Despite these widespread modernist trends in Asia, scholars have also observed decline of rationalism and resurfacing of pre-modern religious teachings and practices: From the 1980s onward, they observed that in Sri Lankan Buddhism devotional religiosity, magical practices, honouring deities as well as moral ambiguity had become more widespread, as the effects of Protestant Buddhism were becoming weaker.

Twentieth-century Buddhism in the West 

With the spread of Buddhism to the West in the twentieth century, devotional practices still played an important role among Asian ethnic communities, though much less so in Western "convert" communities. The influence of Buddhist modernism could also be felt in the West, where lay-led organizations often offered meditation courses without much emphasis on devotion. Writers like D. T. Suzuki described meditation as a trans-cultural and non-religious practise, which greatly appealed to westerners. Thus, in Western, secular Buddhism, meditation was more emphasized than in traditional Buddhist communities, and faith or devotion less. Just like in modern Asia, the rational and intellectual aspects of Buddhism were mostly emphasized in the West, as Buddhism was often favourably compared with Christianity. The author and Buddhist teacher Stephen Batchelor has endeavoured to advocate a form of Buddhism which he believes to be original, ancient Buddhism, as it was before it became "institutionalized as a religion".

In contrast to these typical modernist trends, it has also been observed that some western Buddhist communities show great commitment to their practice and belief, and for that reason are more traditional religious than most forms of New Age spirituality. Furthermore, several Buddhist teachers have spoken out against interpretations of Buddhism that do away with all faith and devotion, including translator and monastic Bhikkhu Bodhi. Bhikkhu Bodhi argues that many Westerners have misunderstood the Kalāma Sutta , as Buddhism teaches that faith and personal verification should go hand-in-hand, and faith should not be discarded.

The latter part of the twentieth century has seen a unique situation arising with regard to Buddhism in the West: for the first time since Buddhism left India many Buddhist traditions are able to communicate in the same language. This has led to an increased eclecticism between the different traditions. Furthermore, with the increase of scientific research in meditation methods, prominent Buddhist authors are pointing to scientific evidence to verify whether Buddhist practice is really effective or not, rather than referring to scriptural or monastic authority.

Navayāna 

In 1956, the Indian dalit (untouchable) and icon Ambedkar (1891–1956) led a mass conversion to Buddhism, starting a new Buddhist movement (Navayāna). This new movement led to a pattern of mass conversions, some of them reaching up to 500,000 people, simultaneously converting. Dalits that were dissatisfied with the Indian caste system took refuge in Buddhism as a way out. In the 2010s, violent incidents affecting dalits led to a revival of mass conversions in Gujarat and other states. Some converts admit that the conversion is a political choice to reorganize themselves, as conversion could help them to no longer be classified by the Hindu caste system.

Scholars have described Ambedkar's perspective on Buddhism as secular and modernist rather than religious, as he emphasized the atheist aspects of Buddhism and rationality, and rejected Hindu soteriology and hierarchy. Other scholars have interpreted Ambedkarism as a form of critical traditionalism, in which Ambedkar reinterprets traditional Hindu concepts rather than rejecting them altogether. Specifically, scholar Gauri Viswanathan states that Ambedkar's Dalit conversions give belief a more central, worldly role than it had before. Cross-cultural researcher Ganguly Debjani, however, points at  religious elements in Ambedkar's description of the Buddha's life and teaching, and states that Ambedkar deifies the Buddha as the "fount of Rationality". Several scholars have argued that the Buddha and Ambedkar are honoured by his followers through traditional devotional practices, such as story-telling, songs and poetry, festivals, and images, despite Ambedkar's rejection of such practices.

See also 
 Faith in Christianity
 Faith in the Bahá'í Faith
 Faith in Nyingma Buddhist Dharma

Notes

Citations

Sources

External links 
 The Power of Faith, Ajahn Ñāṇadhammo
 BBC documentary about the nature of Buddhist faith in traditional Buddhist countries, with comments from notable scholars
 BBC documentary about self-power and other-power in Japanese Buddhism, by Ronald Eyre, part of the awarded The Long Search series
 Is Buddhism a Religion? First of a series of articles in the British newspaper The Guardian about the religious and secular aspects of Buddhism
 Debate held by the Melbourne Insight Meditation Group about being Buddhist, orthodoxy and faith, between  Ajahn Brahmali and Stephen Batchelor

 
Buddhist belief and doctrine
Faith
Wholesome factors in Buddhism